The Cupa României is Romania's main football cup competition.

Cupa României may also refer to:
Cupa României (ice hockey)
Cupa României (rugby union)
Cupa României (women's basketball)

See also
Supercupa României, a football playoff between Romanian league and cup winners